The Lange EA 42 is an electrical aero engine designed for self launching gliders. It is produced in Germany by Lange Aviation for their Antares 20E glider.

Development
The EA 42 combines an EM 42 brushless 42 kW electric external rotor motor with a related engine control system and power electronics. It is powered by a battery pack.

Applications

Lange Antares 20E
Lange Antares 23E
Schempp-Hirth Arcus E

Specifications (EA 42)

EM42 electrical engine

LE 42 power electronics
Length: 
Width: 
Height: 
Mass:

References

External links

Aircraft electric engines